In college football, 2011 NCAA football bowl games may refer to:

2010–11 NCAA football bowl games, for games played in January 2011 as part of the 2010 season
2011–12 NCAA football bowl games, for games played in December 2011 as part of the 2011 season